USS Grouse (AMc-12) was a coastal minesweeper of the United States Navy. The ship, formerly the New Bol, was launched in 1938 by Martinac Shipbuilding Co., Tacoma, Washington; acquired by the Navy in 1940; and commissioned on 20 June 1941 at San Diego, California. After shakedown off San Diego, California, Grouse performed patrol and minesweeping duties in the 11th Naval District. Grouse was decommissioned on 26 August 1944. Struck from the Navy List on 23 September 1944, she was transferred to the Maritime Commission for disposal on 5 February 1945.

References

External links
 

Merchant ships of the United States
Ships built in Tacoma, Washington
1938 ships
Minesweepers of the United States Navy
World War II minesweepers of the United States